The 2nd Alberta Legislative Assembly was in session from March 23, 1909, to April 17, 1913, with the membership of the assembly determined by the results of the 1909 Alberta general election which was held on March 22, 1909. The Legislature officially resumed on March 23, 1909, and continued until the fourth session was prorogued and dissolved on March 25, 1913, prior to the 1913 Alberta general election.

Alberta's second government was controlled by the majority Liberal Party led by Premier Alexander Rutherford until he resigned on May 26, 1910 due to the Alberta and Great Waterways Railway scandal, Rutherford was subsequently replaced by Arthur Sifton. The Official Opposition was the Conservative Party led by Richard Bennett for the first session, followed by Edward Michener for the remaining sessions. The Speaker was Charles W. Fisher who continued in the role from the 1st assembly, and would serve in the role until his death from the 1918 flu pandemic in 1919.

The total number of seats in the assembly was increased from 25 contested in the 1905 election to 41.

Bills

The Act respecting the Legislative Assembly of Alberta
Prior to the 1913 election, the Liberal government introduced An Act to amend the Act respecting the Legislative Assembly of Alberta which increased the number of seats in the Alberta Legislature from 41 to 56 and redistributed the boundaries of several constituencies.

The Direct Legislation Act
Following pressure from the growing United Farmers of Alberta, the Alberta Legislature passed The Direct Legislation Act, which was assented to on March 25, 1913. The Act enabled a referendum to be held if an initiative petition received a sufficient number of signatures, which was electors equally ten per cent of the votes polled in the previous general election, and an initiative petition could succeed if endorsed by 20 per cent of the votes polled in the previous election. The Act afforded a number of protections for the Legislature, noting that any initiative which would create a grant or charge on public revenue, or outside of provincial jurisdiction was invalid. While the Conservative Party's 1912 convention included an endorsement of Direct Legislation provisions, the party leader Edward Michener called it a "vote-catching device" and George Hoadley wondered if the Act would be successful compared to similar legislation in Saskatchewan. Socialist member Charles M. O'Brien described the bill as "ridiculous" and "neither consistent, systematic or scientific".

Scandals

The Alberta and Great Waterways Railway Scandal was a political scandal in 1910, which forced the resignation of the Liberal provincial government of Alexander Cameron Rutherford.  Rutherford and his government were accused of giving loan guarantees to private interests for the construction of the Alberta and Great Waterways (A&GW) Railway that substantially exceeded the actual cost of construction, and which paid interest considerably above the market rate.  They were also accused of exercising insufficient oversight over the railway's operations.

The scandal split the Liberal Party: Rutherford's Minister of Public Works, William Henry Cushing, resigned from his government and publicly attacked its railway policy, and a large portion of the Liberal caucus voted to defeat the government in the Legislative Assembly of Alberta.  Although the government survived all of these votes, and Rutherford largely placated the legislature by appointing a royal commission to investigate the affair, pressure from Lieutenant-Governor George Bulyea forced Rutherford's resignation and his replacement by Arthur Sifton.

The royal commission reported months after Rutherford had already resigned.  The majority did not find Rutherford or his cabinet guilty of any wrongdoing, but criticized them for poor judgment, both in relation to the loan guarantees and in relation to the exemptions the A&GW received from provincial legislation; a minority report was more sympathetic, and declared the allegations against them "disproved".  James Cornwall, a Liberal backbencher who supported Rutherford, fared somewhat worse: his personal financial involvement in the railway gave rise to "suspicious circumstances", but he too was not proven guilty of any wrongdoing.

Besides provoking Rutherford's resignation, the scandal opened rifts in the Liberal Party that took years to heal.  Sifton eventually smoothed over most of these divisions, but was frustrated in his railway policy by legal defeats.  He ultimately adopted a similar policy to Rutherford's, and the A&GW was eventually built by private interests using the money raised from provincial loan guarantees.  The Liberals went on to be re-elected in 1913 and 1917.

Party composition

Members elected during the 1909 Alberta Provincial Election
For complete electoral history, see individual districts

July 15, 1909

Standings changes after election

By-elections
By-elections are only shown if new members were elected

Floor crossings
June 22, 1910—Archibald McLean crossed the floor to the Liberal Party to accept a cabinet portfolio, he was acclaimed in a by-election
Date Unknown—James Cornwall leaves the Liberal Party and becomes an Independent

References

Citations

Bibliography

Further reading

External links
Alberta Legislative Assembly
Legislative Assembly of Alberta Members Book
By-elections 1905 to present

02